World War III is the third studio album by American post-hardcore band Madina Lake, released on September 13, 2011. The first single from the album is "Hey Superstar", and the second one is "Imagineer" produced by Billy Corgan. This is their first album after leaving Roadrunner Records and signing with Razor & Tie.

Track listing

Notes
 "Across 5 Oceans" and "Hey Superstar" were used as downloadable tracks in Guitar Hero: Warriors of Rock.
 "Hey Superstar" was their first single and it was released on October 3, 2011, but was used as the theme song for TNA Wrestling's Genesis event in January.
 Four music videos were released, "Hey Superstar" on August 30, 2011, "Imagineer" on September 13, 2011, "Across 5 Ocean" right before starting "Lila, The Divine Game" tour on September 27, 2012, and "They're Coming For Me" during hiatus between it and Farewell tour in 2013.

Critical reception

The album received positive reviews upon its release. From IGN's 90% rating to Rock Sound's 70%, the album has been well received. Chad Grischow of IGN said "Regardless of whether you have followed the tale from the start or this is your first taste of Madina Lake, World War III proves to be a satisfying conclusion to the tale and stands up well on its own as simply a great rock album." Kerrang! rated the album 4 Ks out of 5 and stated that "There is much to like about World War III, both in terms of its energy and its exuberant and determined quality."

Personnel
Madina Lake
 Nathan Leone – lead vocals
 Mateo Camargo – guitar, backing vocals
 Matthew Leone – bass guitar, backing vocals
 Dan Torelli – drums, percussion, backing vocals

Production
Mateo Camargo - production, mixing, engineering
Billy Corgan – production on "Imagineer"
Chris Lord-Alge - Mixing
John Naclerio - Mastering

Guest Vocals
Dave Casey - "Take Me Or Leave"
Maria Jose Camargo - "Heroine", "They're Coming For Me" and "What It Is To Wonder"

Release history

References

2011 albums
Madina Lake albums
Razor & Tie albums